Strand Road Halt was a minor railway station or halt/request stop in north Devon, England, close to Bideford, on the Bideford, Westward Ho! and Appledore Railway, serving the outskirts of the town. It lay 0 mile and 32 chains from Bideford Quay.

History 
The halt lay close to the "Yard" with its sidings, carriage shed and engine shed. The name was often shortened to The Strand.

Infrastructure
The halt had no freight facilities. A platform does not appear to have been provided and as a request stop passengers had to clearly indicate that the train should halt. A single storey signal box was present with home semaphore signals.

Micro history

In January 1901, the first train, with one carriage, ran from Bideford to Northam carrying a few friends of the Directors.

The fare from Bideford Quay to The Strand Halt was 1d.

See also
Bideford, Westward Ho! and Appledore Railway

References

Bibliography
 
 Christie, Peter (1995). North Devon History. The Lazarus Press. .
 Garner, Rod (2008). The Bideford, Westward Ho! & Appledore Railway. Pub. Kestrel Railway Books. .
 Griffith, Roger (1969). The Bideford, Westward Ho! and Appledore Railway. School project and personal communications. Bideford Museum.
 
 Stuckey, Douglas (1962). The Bideford, Westward Ho! and Appledore Railway 1901-1917. Pub. West Country Publications.

External links

Disused railway stations in Devon
Former Bideford, Westward Ho! and Appledore Railway stations
Railway stations in Great Britain opened in 1901
Railway stations in Great Britain closed in 1917
Torridge District